Enrico Forcella Pelliccioni (October 18, 1907 – October 25, 1989) was a Venezuelan shooter. He competed at the 1960, 1964 and 1968 Olympics in the small-bore rifle, prone position, 50 m and finished in 3rd, 15th and 44th place, respectively.

References

1907 births
1989 deaths
Olympic bronze medalists for Venezuela
Shooters at the 1960 Summer Olympics
Shooters at the 1964 Summer Olympics
Shooters at the 1968 Summer Olympics
Venezuelan male sport shooters
ISSF rifle shooters
Olympic shooters of Venezuela
Medalists at the 1960 Summer Olympics
Pan American Games gold medalists for Venezuela
Pan American Games medalists in shooting
Shooters at the 1963 Pan American Games
Olympic medalists in shooting
Medalists at the 1963 Pan American Games
20th-century Venezuelan people